Lake Pend Oreille in the northern Idaho Panhandle is the largest lake in the U.S. state of Idaho and the 38th-largest lake by area in the United States, with a surface area of . The lake is fed by the Clark Fork River and the Pack River, and drains into the Pend Oreille River, as well as subsurfacely into the Spokane Valley–Rathdrum Prairie Aquifer.
It is surrounded by national forests and a few small towns, with the largest population on the lake at Sandpoint. The majority of the shoreline is non-populated and all but the southern tip of the lake is in Bonner County. The southern tip is in Kootenai County and is home to Farragut State Park, formerly the Farragut Naval Training Station during World War II, of which a small part is still active and conducts U.S. Navy acoustic underwater submarine research.

The surrounding forests consist of ponderosa pine, Douglas fir, red cedar, poplar, quaking aspen, hemlock, paper birch and western larch.  Local animal species include white-tailed deer, elk, gray wolves, moose, mice, squirrels, chipmunks, black bears, grizzly bear, coyotes, mountain goat, cougar and bobcats, along with bald eagles, wild turkeys, osprey, owls, hummingbirds, hawks, woodpeckers, ducks, and the mountain bluebird. The lake is a home for several species of migratory water fowl.

History 

Lake Pend Oreille was glacially formed during the ice age. It is also believed that the eastern side of the lake was in the path of the ancient Missoula Flood. The lake sits at the south end of the Purcell Trench, carved by glaciers moving south from Canada. The eastern side of the glacier is believed to have formed the dam for the Missoula flood, at the point where the Clark Fork river enters the lake between the Cabinet and Bitterroot mountains. Along with Crater Lake, Lake Tahoe, Lake Chelan, and Lake Superior, Lake Pend Oreille is among the five deepest lakes in the United States.

The area around the lake is the traditional home of the Kalispel Indian peoples. David Thompson established a North West Company trading post on the lake in 1809. A Canadian fur trader in Thompson's party is believed to have given the lake its name. The words "Pend Oreille" are French for an ear-hanging or pendant. Ear pendants were characteristic of the Kalispel tribe. The lake is shaped much like a human ear when viewed from above or on a map.

During World War II, the south end was the second largest naval training ground in the world and the largest "city" in the state.  Built as a result of the Japanese attack on Pearl Harbor, the training station is now Farragut State Park. The lake's Large Scale Vehicle Range is still used by the Navy's Acoustic Research Detachment for sonar testing with large-scale submarine prototypes on the Pend Oreille Calibration Station. The significant depth gives acoustic properties similar to the open ocean. Background noise is less than at ocean testing locations, and the sound signatures being investigated cannot be monitored by foreign governments in international waters.

In 1967, the former Farragut Naval Training Station was used to accommodate the 12th World Scout Jamboree (1 to 8 August), the dates being significant as it marked 60 years to the date after Sir Robert Baden Powell held his first scout camp on Brownsea Island in Poole Harbour, Dorset in England.

Other information

The following towns are adjacent to the lake:

Sandpoint
Ponderay
Kootenai
Hope
Clark Fork
Bayview
Sagle

The lake is viewed from the Pend Oreille Scenic Byway, State Highway 200 along the north shore.  US 95 crosses the lake via Long bridge. Much of the shore is mountainous. The mountains to the east are the Green Monarchs; to the north are the Cabinet Mountains; to the southwest the Coeur d'Alene Mountains; and to northwest are the Selkirk Mountains.

Aquatic invasive species
The lake is known to harbor several invasive species. Some of these species include:

 Eurasian watermilfoil
 Walleye (Also known as Yellow Pike)
 Lake Trout

Many of the species in the lake's invasive species.

Fish

The lake is home to many species of fish, including rainbow trout, lake trout, bull trout, cutthroat trout, brown trout, cutbow, perch, black crappie, bluegill, largemouth bass, smallmouth bass, whitefish, walleye, northern pike, northern pikeminnow, and kokanee salmon. Lake Pend Oreille is also the home of the  state record gerrard rainbow trout (aka kamloops rainbow) caught by Wes Hamlet in 1947.

See also

Lake Coeur d'Alene
Purcell Trench

References

Other references

External links

 Idaho State Parks - official site - Farragut
 Idaho Public TV - Lake Pend Oreille
 U.S. Navy - Acoustic Research Detachment - Bayview, Idaho
 Global Security.org - U.S. Navy ARD - Bayview, Idaho
 Nav Source.org - photos of LSV-2 Cutthroat - Navy ARD - Bayview, ID
 Lake Pend Oreille Weather Buoy - U.S. Navy
 Idaho Scenic Byways

Pend Oreille
Pend Oreille
Pend Oreille
Sandpoint, Idaho
Tourist attractions in Bonner County, Idaho
Idaho Panhandle National Forest